The 2016–17 UEFA Europa League qualifying phase and play-off round began on 28 June and ended on 25 August 2016. A total of 154 teams competed in the qualifying phase and play-off round to decide 22 of the 48 places in the group stage of the 2016–17 UEFA Europa League.

All times are CEST (UTC+2).

Round and draw dates
The schedule of the competition was as follows (all draws were held at the UEFA headquarters in Nyon, Switzerland, unless stated otherwise).

Matches could also be played on Tuesdays or Wednesdays instead of the regular Thursdays due to scheduling conflicts.

Format
In the qualifying phase and play-off round, each tie was played over two legs, with each team playing one leg at home. The team that scored more goals on aggregate over the two legs advanced to the next round. If the aggregate score was level, the away goals rule would be applied, i.e., the team that scored more goals away from home over the two legs advanced. If away goals were also equal, then thirty minutes of extra time would be played, divided into two fifteen-minutes halves. The away goals rule would be again applied after extra time, i.e., if there were goals scored during extra time and the aggregate score was still level, the visiting team advanced by virtue of more away goals scored. If no goals were scored during extra time, the tie would be decided by penalty shoot-out.

In the draws for each round, teams were seeded based on their UEFA club coefficients at the beginning of the season, with the teams divided into seeded and unseeded pots. A seeded team was drawn against an unseeded team, with the order of legs in each tie decided by draw. Due to the limited time between matches, the draws for the second and third qualifying rounds took place before the results of the previous round were known. For these draws (or in any cases where the result of a tie in the previous round was not known at the time of the draw), the seeding was carried out under the assumption that the team with the higher coefficient of an undecided tie advanced to this round, which means if the team with the lower coefficient was to advance, it simply took the seeding of its defeated opponent. Prior to the draws, UEFA may form "groups" in accordance with the principles set by the Club Competitions Committee, but they are purely for convenience of the draw and for ensuring that teams from the same association are not drawn against each other, and do not resemble any real groupings in the sense of the competition.

Teams
A total of 154 teams were involved in the qualifying phase and play-off round (including the 15 losers of the Champions League third qualifying round which enter the play-off round). The 22 winners of the play-off round advanced to the group stage to join the 16 teams which enter in the group stage and the 10 losers of the Champions League play-off round.

Below are the participating teams (with their 2016 UEFA club coefficients), grouped by their starting rounds.

Notes

First qualifying round

Seeding
A total of 96 teams played in the first qualifying round. The draw was held on 20 June 2016. (Note: The numbers for each team were pre-assigned by UEFA so that the draw could be held in one run for all groups with ten teams and another run for the groups with eight teams.)

Summary
The first legs were played on 28 and 30 June, and the second legs were played on 5, 6 and 7 July 2016.

|}

Notes

Matches

Midtjylland won 2–0 on aggregate.

Heart of Midlothian won 6–3 on aggregate.

Connah's Quay Nomads won 1–0 on aggregate.

Ventspils won 4–0 on aggregate.

Cork City won 2–1 on aggregate.

Levadia Tallinn won 3–1 on aggregate.

HJK won 3–1 on aggregate.

IFK Göteborg won 7–1 on aggregate.

2–2 on aggregate. St Patrick's Athletic won on away goals.

KR won 8–1 on aggregate.

RoPS won 3–1 on aggregate.

Brøndby won 10–1 on aggregate.

Aberdeen won 3–2 on aggregate.

Nõmme Kalju won 5–3 on aggregate.

Dinamo Minsk won 4–1 on aggregate.

Jelgava won 5–4 on aggregate.

Shakhtyor Soligorsk won 7–0 on aggregate.

AIK won 4–0 on aggregate.

Cliftonville won 3–1 on aggregate.

Odd won 3–1 on aggregate.

Domžale won 5–2 on aggregate.

Vojvodina won 6–1 on aggregate.

AEK Larnaca won 6–1 on aggregate.

1–1 on aggregate. Shirak won 4–1 on penalties.

Birkirkara won 3–1 on aggregate.

Videoton won 3–2 on aggregate.

Lokomotiva won 7–2 on aggregate.

Europa won 3–2 on aggregate.

Čukarički won 6–3 on aggregate.

Budućnost Podgorica won 2–1 on aggregate.

3–3 on aggregate. Zimbru Chișinău won on away goals.

Beitar Jerusalem won 1–0 on aggregate.

Kukësi won 2–1 on aggregate.

Neftçi Baku won 3–2 on aggregate.

Admira Wacker Mödling won 4–3 on aggregate.

Beroe Stara Zagora won 2–0 on aggregate.

Debrecen won 7–0 on aggregate.

Vaduz won 5–2 on aggregate.

Maccabi Tel Aviv won 4–0 on aggregate.

Gabala won 6–3 on aggregate.

Kairat won 6–0 on aggregate.

Spartak Trnava won 6–0 on aggregate.

Omonia won 5–1 on aggregate.

Shkëndija won 4–1 on aggregate.

Zagłębie Lubin won 3–1 on aggregate.

MTK Budapest won 3–1 on aggregate.

Partizani replaced Skënderbeu in the 2016–17 UEFA Champions League second qualifying round and Slovan Bratislava proceeded directly to the UEFA Europa League second qualifying round, after Skënderbeu was excluded by UEFA for match-fixing.

Kapaz won 1–0 on aggregate.

Second qualifying round

Seeding
A total of 66 teams played in the second qualifying round: 18 teams which entered in this round, and the 48 winners of the first qualifying round. The draw was held on 20 June 2016. (Note: The numbers for each team were pre-assigned by UEFA so that the draw could be held in one run for all groups with ten teams and another run for the groups with twelve teams.)

Notes

Summary
The first legs were played on 14 July, and the second legs were played on 20 and 21 July 2016.

|}

Notes

Matches

Spartak Trnava won 3–1 on aggregate.

Dinamo Minsk won 2–1 on aggregate.

0–0 on aggregate. Zagłębie Lubin won 4–3 on penalties.

Vojvodina won 3–1 on aggregate.

2–2 on aggregate. Nõmme Kalju won 5–3 on penalties.

1–1 on aggregate. Brøndby won 5–3 on penalties.

Domžale won 3–2 on aggregate.

Austria Wien won 5–1 on aggregate.

Gabala won 4–1 on aggregate.

HJK won 2–1 on aggregate.

Lokomotiva won 4–1 on aggregate.

Shkëndija won 1–0 on aggregate.

Grasshopper won 5–4 on aggregate.

Midtjylland won 5–2 on aggregate.

Osmanlıspor won 7–2 on aggregate.

PAS Giannina won 4–3 on aggregate.

Birkirkara won 2–1 on aggregate.

1–1 on aggregate. Maribor won on away goals.

IFK Göteborg won 3–0 on aggregate.

Jelgava won 3–0 on aggregate.

3–3 on aggregate. Beitar Jerusalem won on away goals.

Admira Wacker Mödling won 3–0 on aggregate.

Aberdeen won 4–0 on aggregate.

Cork City won 2–1 on aggregate.

Maccabi Tel Aviv won 3–2 on aggregate.

Torpedo-BelAZ Zhodino won 3–1 on aggregate.

Hajduk Split won 4–3 on aggregate.

Videoton won 3–1 on aggregate.

AEK Larnaca won 5–2 on aggregate.

AIK won 2–0 on aggregate.

3–3 on aggregate. Slavia Prague won on away goals.

2–2 on aggregate. Genk won 4–2 on penalties.

SønderjyskE won 4–3 on aggregate.

Third qualifying round

Seeding
A total of 58 teams played in the third qualifying round: 25 teams which entered in this round, and the 33 winners of the second qualifying round. The draw was held on 15 July 2016. (Note: The numbers for each team were pre-assigned by UEFA so that the draw could be held in one run for the group with 10 teams and another run for all groups with 12 teams.)

Notes

Summary
The first legs were played on 28 July, and the second legs were played on 3 and 4 August 2016.

|}

Notes

Matches

Lokomotiva won 3–2 on aggregate.

Saint-Étienne won 1–0 on aggregate.

AEK Larnaca won 2–1 on aggregate.

Maccabi Tel Aviv won 5–2 on aggregate.

Vojvodina won 3–1 on aggregate.

SønderjyskE won 3–2 on aggregate.

Sassuolo won 4–1 on aggregate.

1–1 on aggregate. Slavia Prague won on away goals.

Krasnodar won 6–1 on aggregate.

AZ won 3–1 on aggregate.

Beitar Jerusalem won 4–1 on aggregate.

1–1 on aggregate. Austria Wien won 5–4 on penalties.

Panathinaikos won 3–0 on aggregate.

Osmanlıspor won 3–0 on aggregate.

Maribor won 2–1 on aggregate.

Gabala won 2–1 on aggregate.

Hajduk Split won 6–1 on aggregate.

Brøndby won 3–2 on aggregate.

2–2 on aggregate. İstanbul Başakşehir won on away goals.

1–1 on aggregate. Arouca won on away goals.

Rapid Wien won 3–0 on aggregate.

Genk won 3–1 on aggregate.

Shkëndija won 2–1 on aggregate.

West Ham United won 4–2 on aggregate.

Midtjylland won 2–1 on aggregate.

IFK Göteborg won 3–2 on aggregate.

Slovan Liberec won 4–1 on aggregate.

Gent won 5–0 on aggregate.

Grasshopper won 5–4 on aggregate.

Play-off round

Seeding
A total of 44 teams played in the play-off round: the 29 winners of the third qualifying round, and the 15 losers of the 2016–17 UEFA Champions League third qualifying round. The draw was held on 5 August 2016. (Note: The numbers for each team were pre-assigned by UEFA so that the draw could be held in one run for all groups with 10 teams and another run for all groups with 12 teams.)

Notes

Summary
The first legs were played on 17 and 18 August, and the second legs were played on 25 August 2016.

|}

Notes

Matches

Astana won 4–2 on aggregate.

Olympiacos won 3–1 on aggregate.

Osmanlıspor won 3–0 on aggregate.

Rapid Wien won 4–2 on aggregate.

Genk won 4–2 on aggregate.

Slovan Liberec won 4–0 on aggregate.

PAOK won 5–0 on aggregate.

Austria Wien won 4–2 on aggregate.

Saint-Étienne won 2–1 on aggregate.

AZ won 3–0 on aggregate.

Gabala won 3–2 on aggregate.

Anderlecht won 6–0 on aggregate.

Astra Giurgiu won 2–1 on aggregate.

Fenerbahçe won 5–0 on aggregate.

Panathinaikos won 4–1 on aggregate.

Krasnodar won 4–0 on aggregate.

Gent won 6–1 on aggregate.

Shakhtar Donetsk won 4–1 on aggregate.

Sparta Prague won 3–2 on aggregate.

Sassuolo won 4–1 on aggregate.

Qarabağ won 3–1 on aggregate.

3–3 on aggregate. Maccabi Tel Aviv won 4–3 on penalties.

Statistics
There were 626 goals scored in 263 matches in the qualifying phase and play-off round, for an average of  goals per match.

Top goalscorers

Source:

Top assists

Source:

Notes

References

External links
UEFA Europa League (official website)
UEFA Europa League history: 2016/17

1
June 2016 sports events in Europe
July 2016 sports events in Europe
August 2016 sports events in Europe
UEFA Europa League qualifying rounds